Ilyés is a Hungarian surname. Notable people with the surname include:
 
Annamária Ilyés
Ferenc Ilyés (born 1981), Hungarian handball player
Iuliu Ilyés (born 1957), Romanian engineer and politician
Ildikó Ilyés (born 1966), Hungarian racewalker
Róbert Ilyés

See also
Gyula Illyés
Illés (disambiguation)

Hungarian-language surnames